United Nations Security Council Resolution 227, adopted on October 28, 1966 in a closed meeting, recommended to the General Assembly that pending consideration by the Council it extend the appointment of U Thant as Secretary-General of the United Nations until the end of the 21st regular session of the General Assembly.

See also
List of United Nations Security Council Resolutions 201 to 300 (1965–1971)

References
Text of the Resolution at undocs.org

External links
 

 0227
 0227
October 1966 events